Tanin Thaisinlp (born 26 October 1963) is a Thai sports shooter. He competed in two events at the 1984 Summer Olympics.

References

1963 births
Living people
Tanin Thaisinlp
Tanin Thaisinlp
Shooters at the 1984 Summer Olympics
Place of birth missing (living people)
Shooters at the 1990 Asian Games
Shooters at the 1994 Asian Games
Tanin Thaisinlp
Tanin Thaisinlp